The 2022–23 Czech Women's First League is the 30th season of the Czech Republic's top-tier football league for women. Slavia Prague are the defending champions.

Format
The eight teams will play each other twice for a total of 14 matches per team. After that the top four teams will play a championship round for another six matches per team. The bottom placed four teams play the relegation round. The champions, runners-up and third-placed teams qualify for the 2023–24 UEFA Women's Champions League.

Teams

Team changes

Stadiums

Regular season

Standings
The regular season ended on 26 March 2023.

Results

Personnel and kits

Note: Flags indicate national team as has been defined under FIFA eligibility rules. Players may hold more than one non-FIFA nationality.

References

External links
Season at souteze.fotbal.cz

2022–23 domestic women's association football leagues
2022–23 in Czech football
Czech Women's First League seasons
Current association football seasons